Jumping the broom (or jumping the besom) is a phrase and custom relating to a wedding ceremony in which the couple jumps over a broom. It is most widespread among African Americans and Black Canadians, popularized during the 1970s by the novel and miniseries Roots, and originated in mid-19th-century antebellum slavery in the United States. The custom is also attested in Irish weddings.

Possibly based on an 18th-century idiomatic synonym for a sham marriage (a marriage of doubtful validity), it was popularized with the introduction of civil marriage in Britain by the Marriage Act 1836. The expression may also derive from the custom of jumping over a besom ("broom" refers to the plant from which the household implement is made) associated with the Romanichal Travellers of the United Kingdom, especially those in Wales.

Euphemism for irregular marriage
References to "broomstick marriages" emerged in England during the mid-to-late 18th century to describe a wedding ceremony of doubtful validity. The earliest use of the phrase is in the 1764 English edition of a French work. The French text, describing an elopement, refers to the runaway couple hastily embarking on "un mariage sur la croix de l'épée" (literally "marriage on the cross of the sword"); this was freely translated as "performed the marriage ceremony by leaping over a broomstick".

A 1774 use in the Westminster Magazine also describes an elopement. A man brought his underage fiancée to France and discovered that it was as difficult to arrange a legal marriage there as in England, but declined a suggestion that a French sexton might simply read the marriage service before the couple because "He had no inclination for a Broomstick-marriage". In 1789, the rumoured clandestine marriage between the Prince Regent and Maria Fitzherbert is cited in a satirical song in The Times: "Their way to consummation was by hopping o'er a broom, sir".

Despite these allusions, research by legal historian Rebecca Probert of Warwick University has failed to find evidence of an actual contemporary practice of jumping over a broomstick as a sign of informal union. Probert says that the word broomstick was used in the mid-18th century in several contexts to mean "something ersatz, or lacking the authority its true equivalent might possess"; because the expression broomstick marriage (a sham marriage) was in circulation, folk etymology led to a belief that people once signified an irregular marriage by jumping over a broom. American historian Tyler D. Parry, however, contests the claim that no part of the British custom involved jumping. In his book, Jumping the Broom: The Surprising Multicultural Origins of a Black Wedding Ritual, Parry writes that African Americans and British Americans had a number of cultural exchanges during the 18th and 19th centuries. He describes correlations between the ceremonies of enslaved African Americans and those of the rural British, saying that it is not coincidental that two groups separated by an ocean used similar matrimonial forms revolving around a broomstick. If British practitioners never used a physical leap, Parry wonders how European-Americans and enslaved African Americans in the American South and rural North America learned about the custom.

Later examples of the term broomstick marriage were used in Britain, with the similar implication that the ceremony did not create a legally-binding union. This meaning survived into the early 19th century; during an 1824 case in London about the legal validity of a marriage ceremony consisting of the groom placing a ring on the bride's finger before witnesses, a court official said that the ceremony "amounted to nothing more than a broomstick marriage, which the parties had it in their power to dissolve at will."

The Marriage Act 1836, which introduced civil marriage, was contemptuously called the "Broomstick Marriage Act" by those who felt that a marriage outside the Anglican church did not deserve legal recognition. The phrase began to refer to non-marital unions; a man interviewed in Mayhew's London Labour and the London Poor said, "I never had a wife, but I have had two or three broomstick matches, though they never turned out happy." Tinkers reportedly had a similar marriage custom, "jumping the budget", with the bride and groom jumping over a string or other symbolic obstacle.

Charles Dickens' novel, Great Expectations (first published in serial form in All the Year Round from 1 December 1860 to August 1861), contains a reference in chapter 48 to a couple's marriage "over the broomstick." The ceremony is not described, but the reference indicates that readers would have recognized this as an informal (not legally valid) agreement.

Although it has been assumed that "jumping (or, sometimes, 'walking') over the broom" always indicated an irregular or non-church union in England (as in the expressions "Married over the besom" and "living over the brush"), examples of the phrase exist in the context of legal religious and civil weddings. Other sources cite stepping over a broom as a test of chastity, and putting out a broom was said to be a sign "that the housewife's place is vacant" as a way of advertising for a wife. The phrase was also used colloquially in the US and Canada as a synonym for getting married legally.

British Romani customs
Romani couples in Wales would elope, when they would "jump the broom", or jump over a branch of flowering common broom or a besom made of broom. Welsh Kale and Romanichals in England and Scotland practiced the ritual into the 1900s. According to Alan Dundes (1996), the custom originated among the Welsh Kale and English Romanichals.

C.W. Sullivan III (1997) replied to Dundes that the custom originated among the Welsh people, and was known as a priodas coes ysgub ("besom wedding"). Sullivan's source is Welsh folklorist Gwenith Gwynn (also known as W. Rhys Jones), who assumed that the custom had existed on the basis of conversations with elderly Welsh people during the 1920s (none of whom, however, had seen it). One said, "It must have disappeared before I was born, and I am seventy-three".
Gwynn's dating of the custom to the 18th century rested on the assumption that it must have disappeared before the elderly interviewees were born, and on his misreading of the Llansantffraid Glyn Ceiriog parish baptismal register.
 
Local variations of the custom developed in portions of England and Wales. Instead of placing the broom on the ground and jumping together, the broom was placed at an angle by the doorway; the groom jumped first, followed by the bride. In southwest England, Wales and the border areas between Scotland and England, "[while some] couples ... agreed to marry verbally, without exchanging legal contracts[,] ... [o]thers jumped over broomsticks placed across their thresholds to officialize their union and create new households"; this indicated that contract-less weddings and jumping a broomstick were different kinds of marriage.

African-American and Black-Canadian custom

In some African-American and Black-Canadian communities, couples end their wedding ceremony by jumping over a broomstick together or separately. The practice is documented as a marriage ceremony for enslaved people in the Southern United States during the 1840s and 1850s, who were often not permitted to marry legally. Its revival in 20th-century African-American and Black-Canadian culture is due to the novel and miniseries Roots (1976, 1977). Alan Dundes (1996) notes how "a custom which slaves were forced to observe by their white masters has been revived a century later by African Americans as a treasured tradition".

It has been speculated that the custom may have originated in West Africa. Although there is no direct evidence of this, Dundes cites a Ghanaian custom of waving brooms over the heads of newlyweds and their parents. Among southern Africanswho were largely not a part of the Atlantic slave tradeit represented a wife's commitment (or willingness) to clean the courtyard of her new home. Historian Tyler D. Parry, in Jumping the Broom: The Surprising Multicultural Origins of a Black Wedding Ritual, considers the Ghanaian connection weak; the ritual used by enslaved people has many more similarities to the custom in the British Isles. Parry writes that despite the racial animus which characterized the US South during the nineteenth century, poor white Southerners (many of whom were descendants of people who had irregular forms of matrimony in Britain) and enslaved African Americans had more cultural exchange than is commonly acknowledged.

Slaveholders had a dilemma about committed relationships between enslaved people. Although family stability might be desirable to keep enslaved people tractable and pacified, legal marriage was not; marriage gave a couple rights over each other which conflicted with slaveholderer claims. Most marriages between enslaved black people were not legally recognized during the American slavery era; marriage was a legal civil contract, and civil contracts required the consent of free persons. In the absence of legal recognition, the enslaved community developed its own methods of distinguishing committed unions from casual ones. The ceremonial jumping of the broom was an open declaration of settling down in a marriage relationship. Jumping the broom was done before witnesses as a public, ceremonial announcement that a couple chose to become as nearly married as was then allowed.

Jumping the broom fell out of practice when Black people were free to marry legally. The practice survived in some communities, and the phrase "jumping the broom" was synonymous with "getting married" even if the couple did not literally do so. After its smaller-scale continuity in rural areas of the United States (in Black and white communities), the custom was revivied among African Americans after the publication of Alex Haley's Roots. Danita Rountree Green describes the African-American custom during the early 1990s in her book, Broom Jumping: A Celebration of Love (1992).

In popular culture

American singer-songwriter Brenda Lee released the rockabilly song "Let's Jump the Broomstick" on Decca Records in 1959. Via its association with Wales and the association of the broom with witches, the custom has been adopted by some Wiccans. Jumping the Broom, a film starring Paula Patton and Laz Alonso and directed by Salim Akil, was released on 6 May 2011.

In the 1977 TV miniseries Roots, Kunta Kinte/"Toby" (John Amos as the adult Kunta Kinte) had a marriage ceremony in which he and Belle (Madge Sinclair) jumped the broom. It also appears in episode two of the 2016 miniseries remake, when Kunta Kinte questions its African origins. An engaged couple jumps a broom in the 2016 film, The Birth of a Nation. Lance (Morris Chestnut) and Mia (Monica Calhoun) jump over the broom after they get married in The Best Man (1999). 

In "R & B", an episode of This Is Us, Randal and Beth jump the broom while walking down the aisle after their wedding ceremony in a flashback. In "Things We Said Today", an episode of Grey's Anatomy, Miranda Bailey and Ben Warren jump over a broom at the end of their wedding ceremony. Amani and Woody jump the broom at the end of their wedding in a 2020 episode of Married at First Sight. In the first act of August Wilson's play, The Piano Lesson, Doaker says: "See that? That's when him and Mama Berniece got married. They called it jumping the broom. That's how you got married in them days." Jarette and Iyanna jump the broom at the end of their wedding in a 2022 episode of Love Is Blind.

See also
 Marriage of enslaved people (United States)
Culture

References

Further reading

External links
 Happy is the Bride the Sun Shines on at Googlebooks

Wedding traditions
Weddings in the United States
Weddings in Canada
African-American culture
Black Canadian culture
Marriage, unions and partnerships in Scotland
Romani culture
Jumping